Fuad Hamza, also known as Fuad Bey Hamza, (1899–1951) was a Palestinian who served as Saudi ambassador to France and the United States and as King Abdulaziz's adviser and representative. Hafiz Wahba and he were the first ambassadors of Saudi Arabia, the former in the United Kingdom and the latter in France. In addition, they were among the advisers whom King Abdulaziz employed to improve the decision-making process of the state.

Early life, origin and education
Fuad Hamza was born in Abey, Lebanon, in 1899. He was from Palestine, and The Times reported on 1 September 1936 that his family were from Ramallah. Clive Leatherdale argues that he was a Druze from Lebanon. Isadore Jay Gold also states that he was a Druze, but from Syria. Hamza was a graduate of the American College of Beirut and the Jerusalem Law School.

Career
Hamza was one of the personal advisers of King Abdulaziz and first served him as a translator. Next he was made a member of the political committee at the Saudi royal court. He was appointed deputy foreign minister in 1930 replacing Abdullah Al Damluji in the post, an Iraqi adviser of King Abdulaziz. Following the establishment of the council of deputies (Majlis al Wukala) in December 1931 Hamza was made one of its four members as the deputy for foreign affairs. In this capacity Hamza signed an amity treaty on behalf of Saudi Arabia with Egypt in Cairo on 7 May 1936. Through the treaty Egypt recognized Saudi Arabia as an independent and sovereign state, and diplomatic relations between two countries began. The same year King Abdulaziz named Hamza as his emissary to the Palestine issue, but Hamza could not attend the meetings due to his illness. However, Hamza met with David Ben Gurion, chairman of the Zionist and Jewish Agency Executive, at his Beirut home on 13 April 1937. In this unofficial meeting Ben Gurion attempted to get information about King Abdulaziz's views on the formation of a Jewish state in the Middle East, and Hamza suggested him to meet with Ibn Saud as well as Crown Prince Saud and Yusuf Yasin during the latter's visit to London for the coronation of King George VI. Hamza visited Germany to negotiate arms sales and met with the Nazi officials in the period 23–27 August 1938.

Hamza was named as the Saudi ambassador to France in 1939. He represented Saudi Arabia in the Vichy Conference and the Ankara Conference held during World War II. Hamza attempted to coordinate a correspondence between King Abdulaziz and Adolf Hitler in the same period. In November 1941 the King sent him a telegram stating that his attempts would be harmful for Saudi Arabia, and ordered him to terminate all his relations with Nazi officials.

Following World War II Hamza was appointed Saudi ambassador to the United States. In 1947 he was named as the minister of development. He worked at the Foreign Ministry of Saudi Arabia as deputy minister until his death in 1951. Yusuf Yasin replaced him in the post.

Personal life, death and work
His brother, Tawfik, also worked at the Saudi royal court. Hamza died in 1951. He published several books on Saudi Arabia. One of them is about the Arab tribes which was an authentic work on the topic.

References

Fuad
Fuad
20th-century Saudi Arabian writers
1899 births
1951 deaths
Fuad
Fuad
American University of Beirut alumni
Government ministers of Saudi Arabia
Fuad
Fuad